Blancpain SA is a Swiss luxury watch manufacturer, headquartered in Paudex/Le Brassus, Switzerland. It designs, manufactures, distributes, and sells prestige and luxury mechanical watches. Founded by Jehan-Jacques Blancpain in Villeret, Switzerland in 1735, Blancpain is the oldest surviving watchmaking brand. Blancpain has been a subsidiary of the Swiss Swatch Group since 1992, and is regarded as a top-tier Swatch brand.

It is best known for its Fifty Fathoms diving watch introduced in 1953 and its 1735 Grande Complication wristwatch introduced in 1991.

History

Early history 
Jehan-Jacques Blancpain started making watches in 1735 in Villeret, Switzerland. He founded the Blancpain brand, setting up his first workshop on the upper floor of his house at Villeret, in the present-day Bernese Jura.

In 1815, Frédéric-Louis Blancpain, the great-grandson of Jehan-Jacques, who was head of the family business at the time, modernized production methods and transformed the traditional craft workshop into an industrial undertaking capable of serial production. By replacing the crown-wheel mechanism with a cylinder escapement, Frédéric-Louis introduced a major innovation into the watchmaking world.

In the second half of the 19th century, as industrialization took hold, the prices of watchmaking products were falling and many workshops were fated to close down. To face up to American competition, in 1865 Blancpain built a two-storey factory by the River Suze and made use of water power to supply the electricity needed for its production processes. By modernizing its methods and concentrating on top-of-the-line products, Blancpain became one of the few watchmaking firms to survive in Villeret.

Re-organization 

In 1926, the Manufacture entered into a partnership with John Harwood and started marketing the first automatic wristwatch. The year 1932 saw the end of the family's management of the firm, which had lasted for over two centuries. On the death of Frédéric-Emile Blancpain, his only daughter, Berthe-Nellie, did not wish to go into watchmaking. The following year, the two members of the staff who had been closest to Frédéric-Emile, Betty Fiechter and André Léal, bought the business. As there was no longer any member of the Blancpain family in control of the firm, the two associates were obliged by law as it stood at the time to change the company name. The firm would be called Rayville S.A., succ. de Blancpain, "Rayville" being a phonetic anagram of Villeret. Despite this change of name, the identity of the Manufacture was perpetuated, and the characteristics of the brand were preserved.

Betty Fiechter remained director of Blancpain until 1950, when her nephew, Jean-Jacques Fiechter, joined her. At the end of the 1950s, Rayville-Blancpain was producing more than 100,000 watches per year. To make it possible to meet the continually growing demand, the firm became part of the SSIH, joining such brands as Omega SA, Tissot and Lemania. In 1971, the company's annual production reached the historical peak of 220,000 watches. During the quartz crisis of the 1970s, SSIH was forced to reduce its output by half and to sell off part of its assets.

Recent development 
In 1983, SSIH sold the Rayville-Blancpain name to Jacques Piguet, son of Frédéric Piguet and director of the company of that name, and Jean-Claude Biver, at that time employed by the SSIH. The company set up production at Le Brassus, in the Joux Valley, and from then on traded under the name of Blancpain SA.

In 1992, the SSIH purchased Blancpain back for 60 million Swiss Francs. At that time, Blancpain had annual sales of 50 million Swiss Francs. Jean-Claude Biver remained as CEO of Blancpain until 2002. Marc Hayek, the grandson of the Swatch Group's founder and chairman, Nicolas Hayek (1928–2010), has run Blancpain since 2002.

Later, SSIH became known as the Swatch Group, and in July 2010, Frédéric Piguet SA, also owned by Swatch Group, was merged into the firm Blancpain SA. Currently, Blancpain is an active member of the Federation of the Swiss Watch Industry FH.

Motto and slogan 
One of Blancpain's company slogans is "Blancpain has never made a quartz watch and never will."

Watch manufacturing 

According to their commercial slogans, the company has never produced quartz watches in the past and has stated in its advertisements that it never will, nor have they ever produced watches with digital displays. In comparison to a large watchmaker like Rolex, which makes about 2,000 watches a day, Blancpain produces fewer than thirty watches per day. Each watch is made by a single watchmaker.

Important inventions and patents 
 In 1983, created the world's smallest moon-phases display.
 In 1987, created the world's thinnest self-winding chronograph and the smallest minute-repeater movement at the time.
 In 1988, created the world's thinnest split-second chronograph at the time.
 In 2000, produced the world's first self-winding tourbillon and perpetual calendar, with an eight-day power reserve.
 In 2005, patented the system of under-lug correctors.
 In 2006, patented the "rail effect" stone-setting technique.
 In 2006, created the Tourbillon Semainier, an unprecedented combination of complications with a seven-day power reserve.
In 2008, produced the world's first movement with a one-minute flying carousel and 100-hour power reserve.

Notable models

Villeret 

The Villeret collection is marketed as Blancpain's most classic collection. Named after the birthplace of Blancpain, the Villeret collection has been a flagship line of the company since 1980s. The collection not only includes wristwatches with simple and elegant designs, but also include watches with complications such as triple calendar, moon phase, and carousel.

Fifty Fathoms 
Blancpain is known for its Fifty-Fathoms watch, produced in collaboration with the French Navy’s Nageurs de Combat (combat swimmers) led by Captain Bob Maloubier and Lieutenant Claude Riffaud, and worn by Jacques Cousteau. From 1958, Fifty-Fathoms was standard issue of the US Navy's combat divers and United States Navy SEALs. The watch has a water-resistant level up to 91 meters.

1735 Grande Complication 
Blancpain is famous for being the creator of one of the most complicated mechanical watches ever made, the Blancpain 1735, which is a true grand complication (Tourbillon, minute repeater, perpetual calendar, split chrono), a limited edition of 30 pieces only, production of just one piece per year.

Notable patrons and owners

Artists 
 Francis Ford Coppola, American film director (The Godfather series) & multiple Academy Awards winner

Celebrities 
Vladimir Kramnik, Russian chess grandmaster
Marilyn Monroe, American actress
 Brad Pitt, American actor

Politicians 
 Vladimir Putin, President of Russia

Sponsorship 
Blancpain sponsors Motorsport programs including the Blancpain Endurance Series, Blancpain Sprint Series, Blancpain GT Series until 2019 when the sponsorship was discontinued,  Lamborghini Blancpain Super Trofeo series, ADAC GT Masters and Reiter Engineering's GT1 and GT3 cars until Reiter mostly stopped racing Lamborghinis.

See also 
 List of watch manufacturers
Manufacture d'horlogerie

References

External links 

 Blancpain homepage
 Blancpain, the history of the oldest watch brand
 Blancpain corporate history
 The making of a Blancpain Tourbillon

Swiss watch brands
Luxury brands
The Swatch Group
1735 establishments in Europe
18th-century establishments in the Old Swiss Confederacy
Companies established in 1735
Companies based in the canton of Vaud
Manufacturing companies established in 1735
Watch manufacturing companies of Switzerland